"Wow" (stylized as "Wow.") is a song by American rapper and singer Post Malone. It was released as the first official single from Post Malone's third studio album, Hollywood's Bleeding, via Republic Records on December 24, 2018. The song was written by Malone alongside Billy Walsh, Anthoine Walters, Carl Rosen, and producers Louis Bell and Frank Dukes.

"Wow" peaked at number two on the US Billboard Hot 100 songs chart.

Promotion
Post Malone stated earlier in December that he wished to release another "body of work" before the year was over; his previous single was "Sunflower" with Swae Lee, the lead single from the December 2018 movie Spider-Man: Into the Spider-Verse soundtrack.

Critical reception
HipHop-N-More stated that the song felt like "more than just a throwaway", saying it "could be another big moment for Post on the charts and radio". NME called it one of Post Malone's "most stripped back recordings to date", saying his rapping over a beat is a "stark contrast" to his previous Autotuned vocals and "heavily produced" music. Billboard magazine said the song "bounces along on a tick-tock beat and deep bass thrum", further describing the song as a chronicle of Post's rise to fame.

Accolades

Commercial performance
"Wow." debuted at number 47 on the Billboard Hot 100. In its third week, it moved up to number 11 before ascending to the top 10, where it peaked at number two, being held off the top spot by "7 Rings" by Ariana Grande on April 6, 2019. It fell to number four the following week. Two weeks later it rose again to its peak of number two, this time blocked by the remix of "Old Town Road" by Lil Nas X featuring Billy Ray Cyrus, remaining there for another week, totaling three non-consecutive weeks in the runner-up spot. It remained in the top ten for 24 consecutive weeks.

Remix
The official remix of the song, featuring Compton, Californian  rappers Roddy Ricch and Tyga, premiered on March 15, 2019. There are two versions of audio for the remix. One is the explicit version and the other is the clean edited version, which appears on the various artists compilation album Now That's What I Call Music! 71 (2019) in the United States. The music video for the remix was published on March 25, 2019, on Malone's YouTube channel. The remix also appears in the soundtrack of the videogame NBA 2K20 (2019).

Music video
The music video for "Wow." was released on March 19, 2019, on Malone's YouTube channel. On the day of the song's release, there was an animated Christmas theme video because it was released the day before Christmas.  It features footage of Malone with Red Hot Chili Peppers, DJ Khaled and Mike Alancourt. The video was directed by James DeFina. It has a viewing of 125 million on YouTube as of August 10, 2019. The music video for the remix of the song featuring Roddy Ricch and Tyga was released six days after on March 25, 2019, on Malone's YouTube channel.

Personnel
Credits adapted from Tidal.

 Post Malone – principal vocalist, songwriting
 Louis Bell – production, recording, vocal production, programming, songwriting
 Frank Dukes – production, programming, songwriting
 Billy Walsh – songwriting
 Anthoine Walters - background vocals, songwriting
 Carl Rosen - songwriting
 Manny Marroquin – mixing
 Chris Galland – mixing assistant
 Robin Florent – mixing assistant
 Scott Desmarais – mixing assistant
 Tyga – featured vocalist, songwriting 
 Roddy Ricch – featured vocalist, songwriting 
 Mike Bozzi – mastering

Charts

Weekly charts

Wow (Remix)

Year-end charts

Decade-end charts

Certifications

Release history

See also
 List of number-one singles of 2019 (Finland)
 List of number-one singles from the 2010s (New Zealand)
 List of number-one songs in Norway

References

2018 singles
2018 songs
Post Malone songs
Number-one singles in Finland
Number-one singles in New Zealand
Number-one singles in Norway
Songs written by Post Malone
Songs written by Frank Dukes
Songs written by Louis Bell
Song recordings produced by Frank Dukes
Song recordings produced by Louis Bell